Bush Head is a summit in the Coconino County, Arizona.

References

Landforms of Coconino County, Arizona
Mountains of Arizona
Mountains of Coconino County, Arizona